Shawn William Quinn (born March 1972) is an American football coach and former player. He is the outside linebackers coach at Virginia Tech, a position he has held since 2022. Quinn served as the head football coach at Savannah State University in Savannah, Georgia from 2019 to 2021. He played college football at Carson–Newman University from 1992 to 1995.

Early life and education
Quinn is a native of Chicago. In 1995, Quinn earned a degree in history and political science from Carson–Newman University, a small, private college located in Jefferson City, Tennessee. After attending Carson–Newman, Quinn received a master's degree from Lincoln Memorial University in Harrogate, Tennessee.

Coaching career

Assistant coaching career
Among various stops, Quinn has coached under Jeff Monken at Georgia Southern, under Les Miles at LSU, under Phillip Fulmer at Tennessee, and Rickey Bustle at Louisiana–Lafayette.

Working under Fulmer as a graduate assistant for offense, Quinn coached in three bowl games while at Tennessee: 2000 Fiesta Bowl, 2001 Cotton Bowl Classic, and 2002 Florida Citrus Bowl.

Head coaching career
After one season as defensive coordinator for Savannah State, Quinn took over as the head coach. In his first season of 2019, the Tigers had a 7–3 season—the first winning season since 1998.

In 2021, the Tigers were 8–2 overall and 5–1 in conference.

Virginia Tech
In December 2021, Quinn was the first assistant to join Brent Pry's Hokies staff as a defensive assistant. Pry and Quinn previous served together on staffs at Georgia Southern and Louisiana-Lafayette.

Head coaching record

References

External links
 Virginia Tech profile
 Savannah State profile

Date of birth missing (living people)
1972 births
Living people
American football defensive linemen
Carson–Newman Eagles football players
Charleston Southern Buccaneers football coaches
Georgia Southern Eagles football coaches
Louisiana Ragin' Cajuns football coaches
LSU Tigers football coaches
Northwestern State Demons football coaches
Tennessee Tech Golden Eagles football coaches
Tennessee Volunteers football coaches
The Citadel Bulldogs football coaches
Savannah State Tigers football coaches
Virginia Tech Hokies football coaches
Western Carolina Catamounts football coaches
High school football coaches in Georgia (U.S. state)
High school football coaches in Tennessee
Lincoln Memorial University alumni
Players of American football from Chicago